Anders Hansson may refer to:

 Anders Hansson (racewalker) (1992–2020), Swedish racewalker
 Anders Hansson (politician) (born 1976), Swedish politician
 Anders Hansson (born 1960), Swedish serial killer; see Malmö Östra hospital murders